Benegal is a village in Brahmavar taluk of Udupi District of Karnataka State in India.

Notable people
Benegal Rama Rau - Fourth Governor of the Reserve Bank of India
B. N. Rau - Indian civil servant, jurist, diplomat and statesman known for his key role in drafting the Constitution of India
B. Shiva Rao - A member of the Constituent Assembly of India and an elected representative of the South Kanara constituency in the First Lok Sabha
Shyam Benegal - Indian film director, scriptwriter and documentary filmmaker

References

Villages in Udupi district